This is a list of 92 species in Ligyra, a genus of bee flies in the family Bombyliidae.

Ligyra species

 Ligyra alea Bowden, 1971
 Ligyra alula (Bezzi, 1906)
 Ligyra antica (Walker, 1871)
 Ligyra argyura (Brunetti, 1909)
 Ligyra astarte Greathead, 1980
 Ligyra atricosta (Bezzi, 1924)
 Ligyra audouinii (Macquart, 1840)
 Ligyra aurantiaca (Guérin, 1835)
 Ligyra bombyliformis (Macleay, 1826)
 Ligyra burnsi Paramonov, 1967
 Ligyra calabyana Paramonov, 1967
 Ligyra campbelli Paramonov, 1967
 Ligyra celebesi (Paramonov, 1931)
 Ligyra chinnicki Paramonov, 1967
 Ligyra chrysolampis (Jaennicke, 1867)
 Ligyra cingulata (Wulp, 1885)
 Ligyra coleopterata (Bezzi, 1921)
 Ligyra commoni Paramonov, 1967
 Ligyra cruciata Bowden, 1971
 Ligyra cupido (Bezzi, 1924)
 Ligyra curvata (Meijere, 1911)
 Ligyra dammermani Evenhuis & Yukawa, 1986
 Ligyra dentata (Roberts, 1928)
 Ligyra devecta (Walker, 1860)
 Ligyra dives (Walker, 1849)
 Ligyra doryca (Boisduval, 1835)
 Ligyra erato Bowden, 1971
 Ligyra erebus (Walker, 1849)
 Ligyra eyreana Paramonov, 1967
 Ligyra fasciata Paramonov, 1967
 Ligyra ferrea (Walker, 1849)
 Ligyra flaviventris (Doleschall, 1857)
 Ligyra flavofasciata (Macquart, 1855)
 Ligyra flavotomentosa (Meijere, 1929)
 Ligyra flora (Frey, 1934)
 Ligyra formosana (Paramonov, 1931)  (temperate Asia)
 Ligyra fuscipennis (Macquart, 1848)
 Ligyra galbina Yang, Yao & Cui, 2012
 Ligyra gebleri (Loew, 1854)
 Ligyra guangdonanus Yang, Yao & Cui, 2012
 Ligyra helena (Loew, 1854)
 Ligyra hemifusca (Roberts, 1928)
 Ligyra herzi (Portschinsky, 1891)
 Ligyra incondita Yang, Yao & Cui, 2012
 Ligyra inquinita (Roberts, 1928)
 Ligyra latipennis (Paramonov, 1931)  (temperate Asia)
 Ligyra leptyna Bowden, 1971
 Ligyra leuconoe (Jaennicke, 1867)
 Ligyra leukon Yang, Yao & Cui, 2012
 Ligyra macassarensis (Paramonov, 1931)
 Ligyra melanoptera Bowden, 1964
 Ligyra merope (Wiedemann, 1824)
 Ligyra minerva Paramonov, 1953
 Ligyra nigripennis (Loew, 1852)
 Ligyra nigrocostalis (Guérin-Méneville, 1838)
 Ligyra niveifrons (Bezzi, 1914)
 Ligyra obliqua (Macquart, 1840)
 Ligyra ochracea Bowden, 1971
 Ligyra oenomaus (Rondani, 1875)
 Ligyra orest Paramonov, 1967
 Ligyra orientalis (Paramonov, 1931)  (temperate Asia)
 Ligyra orphnus Yang, Yao & Cui, 2012
 Ligyra paludosa (Meijere, 1911)
 Ligyra peninsularis Pal, 1991
 Ligyra pilad Paramonov, 1967
 Ligyra punctipennis (Macquart, 1850)
 Ligyra purpuraria (Walker, 1852)
 Ligyra robertsi Paramonov, 1967
 Ligyra satyrus (Fabricius, 1775)
 Ligyra semialata Yang, Yao & Cui, 2012
 Ligyra semifuscata (Brunetti, 1912)
 Ligyra septentrionis (Roberts, 1928)
 Ligyra shirakii (Paramonov, 1931)  (temperate Asia)
 Ligyra similis (Coquillett, 1898)
 Ligyra sinuatifascia (Macquart, 1855)
 Ligyra sphinx (Fabricius, 1787)
 Ligyra suffusipennis (Brunetti, 1909)
 Ligyra sumatrensis (Meijere, 1911)
 Ligyra tantalus (Fabricius, 1794)  (temperate Asia)
 Ligyra tenebrosa Paramonov, 1967
 Ligyra thyridophora (Bezzi, 1912)
 Ligyra transiens (Bezzi, 1924)
 Ligyra tristis (Wulp, 1869)
 Ligyra umbrifer (Walker, 1849)
 Ligyra unicincta (Guérin, 1831)
 Ligyra ussuriensis (Paramonov, 1934)
 Ligyra ventrimacula (Doleschall, 1857)
 Ligyra virgo (Bezzi, 1924)
 Ligyra vittata (Ricardo, 1901)
 Ligyra vulcanus (Bezzi, 1924)
 Ligyra zibrina Yang, Yao & Cui, 2012
 Ligyra zonata Yang, Yao & Cui, 2012

References

Ligyra